WSLR-LP (96.5 FM, "WSLR-LPFM") is a listener-supported, non-profit LPFM radio station based in Sarasota, Florida, United States.  The station also streams on line.

See also
List of community radio stations in the United States

References

External links
 

SLR-LP
Community radio stations in the United States
SLR-LP